The C.F. Franke House is a historic building located in Mason City, Iowa, United States.  Built in 1916, the exterior of the two-story structure is covered with stucco.  It utilizes the Mason City variant of the Prairie School style to stucco over corbelled masonry to form the wall panels for visual effect.  Although the eaves on the second story were cut back almost flush with the walls, the house maintains its horizontal emphasis, including the grouping of the casement windows.   It was listed on the National Register of Historic Places in 1980.

References

Houses completed in 1916
Prairie School architecture in Iowa
Houses in Mason City, Iowa
National Register of Historic Places in Mason City, Iowa
Houses on the National Register of Historic Places in Iowa